is a Japanese manga series written and illustrated by Ryoko Yamagishi. It tells a fictionalised account of Prince Shōtoku, a political figure of sixth-century Japan who spread Buddhism, and his unrequited love for Soga no Emishi, which is very unlike the traditionally known stories of these people. It was serialized in Hakusensha's LaLa from 1980 to 1984. The individual chapters were published in 11 tankōbon under the Hana to Yume Comics imprint, which were released between 1981 and 1984. Hi Izuru Tokoro no Tenshi received the 1983 Kodansha Manga Award for the shōjo category.

Manga
Hakusensha released the manga's 11 tankōbon between 1981 and 1984. The manga was re-released into 8 tankōbons, which were released between March and October 1986 by Kadokawa Shoten. The manga was re-released into 7 bunkobons, all released on March 17, 1984.

Reception
Frederik Schodt described Yamagishi's portrayal of Prince Shōtoku as being "a scheming, cross-dressing homosexual with psychic powers".  According to Schodt, Yamagishi's innovation was not in writing a manga with homosexual themes, but in taking Prince Shōtoku, a revered figure in Japan who until recently was featured on the 10,000 yen bank note, and portraying him as homosexual and cross-dressing.  Schodt notes that the period is "ideal" for shōjo manga, as the relationships shown are highly complex, and the costumes are exotic.

References

Further reading
Masanao Amano, Julius Wiedemann (2004) Manga Design
Helen McCarthy (2006) 500 Manga heroes & villains

External links
 
Yaoi Ronsou

Hakusensha manga
Historical anime and manga
Shōjo manga
Shōnen-ai anime and manga
Supernatural anime and manga
Winner of Kodansha Manga Award (Shōjo)
Prince Shōtoku